A waffle slab or two-way joist slab is a concrete slab made of reinforced concrete with concrete ribs running in two directions on its underside. The name waffle comes from the grid pattern created by the reinforcing ribs.

Description 
A waffle slab is flat on top, while joists create a grid like surface on the bottom. The grid is formed by the removal of molds after the concrete sets. This structure was designed to be more solid when used on longer spans and with heavier loads. This type of structure, because of its rigidity, is recommended for buildings that require minimal vibration, like laboratories and manufacturing facilities.  It is also used in buildings that require big open spaces, like theatres or train stations. Waffle slabs are composed by intricate formwork, and may be more expensive than other types of slabs, but depending on the project and the quantity of concrete needed it may be cheaper to build.

There are two types of waffle slab system:

 One way waffle slab system 
 Two way waffle slab system

Construction process 
A waffle slab can be made in different ways but generic forms are needed to give the waffle shape to the slab. The formwork is made up of many elements: waffle pods, horizontal supports, vertical supports, cube junctions, hole plates, clits and steel bars. First the supports are built, then the pods are arranged in place, and finally the concrete is poured.

This process may occur in three different approaches, however the basic method is the same in each:

 In situ: Formwork construction and pouring of concrete occur on site, then the slab is assembled (if required).
 Precast: The slabs are made somewhere else and then brought to the site and assembled.
 Pre-fabricated: The reinforcements are integrated into the slab while being manufactured, without needing to reinforce the assembly on site. This is the most expensive option.

Waffle slab design 
Different guides have been made for architects and engineers to determine various parameters of waffle slabs, primarily the overall thickness and rib dimensions. The following are rules of thumb, which are explained further in the accompanying diagrams:

As a rule of thumb, the depth should be  of the span.
 The distance between ribs is typically .
 The height of the ribs and beams should be  of the span between columns.
 The width of the solid area around the column should be  of the span between columns. Its height should be the same as the ribs.

Advantages 
The waffle slab floor system has several advantages:

 Better for buildings that require less vibrationsthis is managed by the two way joist reinforcements that form the grid. 
 Bigger spans can be achieved with less material, being more economical and environmentally friendly
 Some people find the waffle pattern aesthetically pleasing 
 Greater load capacity than traditional one-way slabs
 Forms can be implemented with wood, concrete or steel
 If holes are provided between the ribs, building services can be run through them. One proprietary implementation of this system is called Holedeck.

Disadvantages 
 Greater quantities of formwork materials are needed, which can be very costly
 Waffle slabs are thicker than flat slabs, so the height between each floor must be greater to have enough space for the slab system and other building services
 Waffle slabs are preferred for flat topographical areas not sloped sites

Examples 

 Royal National Theatre, London, United Kingdom
Washington Metro Building
 Logistic and Telecommunication SL, Madrid, Spain
 Barangaroo House, Sydney, Australia
 GS1 Portugal, Lisboa, Portugal
 Galbraith Hall, UC San Diego, California
 odD House, Quito, Ecuador

See also
 Waffle slab foundation
 Reinforced concrete
 Concrete slab
 Formwork

References 

Floors
Concrete buildings and structures
Concrete
Reinforced concrete
Structural system